Ending inventory is the amount of inventory a company has in stock at the end of its fiscal year.  It is closely related with ending inventory cost, which is the amount of money spent to get these goods in stock.  It should be calculated at the lower of cost or market.

References

1. Intermediate Accounting 8th Canadian Edition, page 433, Kieso, Weygandt, Warfield, Young, Wiecek, John Wiley & Sons Canada, Ltd, 2007, 

Inventory